Chehvaz (also Romanized as Chehvāz and Chahvāz; also known as Chahvāv, Chehū, and Jahvāz) is a village in Mehregan Rural District, in the Central District of Parsian County, Hormozgan Province, Iran. At the 2006 census, its population was 572, in 143 families.

References 

Populated places in Parsian County